Johannes "Jan" de Klerk,  (22 July 1903 – 24 January 1979) was a South African politician. He was the father of F. W. de Klerk, the last apartheid State President of South Africa.

As a member of the National Party, de Klerk served as interim State President for nine days following the retirement of Jacobus Johannes Fouché in 1975. Prior to this, he served as a Senator (1955–1975), Minister of Work and Public Works (1954–1958), Work and Mines (1958–1961), Home Affairs, Work and Immigration (1961), Home Affairs, Education and Arts and Sciences (1961–1966), Education, Arts and Sciences and Information (1966–1967) and National Education (1968–1969), and President of the Senate from 1969 to 1976.

Biography 

The eldest son of Reverend Willem de Klerk, a Dutch Reformed Church minister and his wife Aletta Johanna van Rooy, Jan de Klerk was born 22 July 1903 in Burgersdorp. He spent his childhood in Potchefstroom, in South-West Transvaal. He studied Christian Higher Education at the Potchefstroom University, where he obtained a BA degree and a higher education diploma in 1926 after three years. he was the President of the Student Union, he married Hendrina Cornelia Coetzer on 27 April 1927, and had two sons, Willem Johannes (Wimpie) and Frederik Willem (F.W.).

From 1927 to 1945, Jan de Klerk worked in Nylstroom and Witwatersrand. He was headteacher of a school, and secretary of a white workers' trade union. In January 1947, he became administrative secretary of the National Party for the Rand region and in 1948, chief secretary of the NP of Transvaal. From 1949 to 1955, he was a member of the provincial council of Transvaal.

In 1954, Jan de Klerk was named senator and Minister of Work and Public Works in the government of his brother-in-law, Prime Minister JG Strijdom. This nomination provoked controversy due to the relationship between the two men.

He was a minister in the governments of Hendrik Verwoerd and John Vorster. Until 1969, he successively dealt with mines, home affairs, immigration, and education. While Minister of Education, he helped found the Rand Afrikaans University (RAU) in Johannesburg and the University of Port Elizabeth (UPE), while also chancellor of the University of Potchefstroom (PU vir CHO). He was twice approached to be honorary president of the republic in 1967 and 1968.

In 1968, he was directly involved in the Mafeje affair as he opposed the hirring of Archie Mafeje as a senior lecturer to University of Cape Town (UCT) telling the UCT Council about thegovernment’s intense displeasure at the decision to appoint an African, which is tantamount to flouting the accepted traditional outlook of South Africa. Should your Council disregard my appeal and give effect to this decision, the government will not hesitate in taking such action as it may deem fit to ensure that the tradition referred to above is observedBy the time of his retirement from the cabinet, de Klerk had been a cabinet minister for more than fifteen years and was rewarded with the Decoration for Meritorious Services.

From 1969 to 1976, he presided over the Senate or upper house of the South African parliament, and this meant that he was briefly interim State President of South Africa in 1975, under a dormant commission that was invoked. He retired from political life, spent his last few years on a farm and died in Krugersdorp on 24 January 1979.

Legacy 

A school in Krugersdorp is named in honour of Jan de Klerk.

Ancestry

External links 
 Biography

References

 

1903 births
1979 deaths
People from Burgersdorp
Afrikaner people
South African people of Dutch descent
National Party (South Africa) politicians
State Presidents of South Africa
Education ministers of South Africa
Presidents of the Senate of South Africa
Ministers of Home Affairs of South Africa